Shureh Del (also Romanized as Shūreh Del; also known as Shūr Del) is a village in Aghmiyun Rural District, in the Central District of Sarab County, East Azerbaijan Province, Iran. At the 2006 census, its population was 338, in 88 families.

References 

Populated places in Sarab County